The Bishop of Zanzibar may refer to;

Anglican Bishop of Zanzibar, in Tanzania
Roman Catholic Bishop of Zanzibar